Bogdo is a rural locality (a settlement) in Sokrutovsky Selsoviet of Akhtubinsky District, Astrakhan Oblast, Russia. The population was 44 as of 2010. There is 1 street.

Geography 
Bogdo is located 75 km southeast of Akhtubinsk (the district's administrative centre) by road. Pirogovka is the nearest rural locality.

References 

Rural localities in Akhtubinsky District